Meggendorfer is a German surname. Notable people with the surname include:

Friedrich Meggendorfer (1880–1953), German psychiatrist and neurologist
Lothar Meggendorfer (1847–1925), German illustrator and cartoonist

See also
 Meggendorfer-Blätter

German-language surnames